Sam Bruce Malcolm (born 25 September 1995) is a New Zealand rugby union player who currently plays for the Toronto Arrows in Major League Rugby (MLR).

His preferred position of choice is first five-eighth but is also known to be an accomplished 
halfback as well.

Early career

Malcolm attended Wanganui High School and was a member of the 1st XV. He also played touch rugby and rugby sevens for the school. He moved to Palmerston North to attend Massey University's rugby institute and also study an agricommerce degree. He joined the Varsity club.

He has been in the Hurricanes U20s as well as the Manawatu U19s. Malcolm was also selected for the New Zealand University and Hurricanes development sides in 2016. He was selected for the New Zealand national U20s training squad in 2014 and trialled as a halfback.

Professional rugby

He previously played for in the Mitre 10 Cup and also West Harbour RFC. Then he signed with the Toronto Arrows during their debut in the 2019 Major League Rugby season. His preferred position of choice is first five-eighth but is also known to be an accomplished 
halfback as well.

References 

1995 births
Living people
Expatriate rugby union players in Canada
Manawatu rugby union players
Massey University alumni
New Zealand expatriate rugby union players
New Zealand expatriate sportspeople in Canada
People educated at Wanganui High School
Rugby union fly-halves
Rugby union players from Whanganui
Toronto Arrows players
New Zealand rugby union players
Kamaishi Seawaves players